Rebecca Van Asch (née Quail) (born 2 March 1988) is an Australian Lawn bowler.

Bowls career

World Championship
She won the lawn bowls gold medal in the pairs competition with Kelsey Cottrell at the 2012 World Outdoor Bowls Championship in addition to the team event.

In 2016, she was part of the fours team with Carla Krizanic, Natasha Scott and Kelsey Cottrell who won the gold medal at the 2016 World Outdoor Bowls Championship in Christchurch, a second gold medal in the triples with Scott and Krizanic and a third gold in the team event.

In 2020 she was selected for the 2020 World Outdoor Bowls Championship in Australia.

Commonwealth Games
She was part of the Australian team for the 2018 Commonwealth Games on the Gold Coast in Queensland where she claimed two more gold medals in the Fours with Cottrell, Scott and Krizanic and the Triples with Scott and Krizanic.

In 2022, she competed in the women's triples and the Women's fours at the 2022 Commonwealth Games.

Asia Pacific
Van Asch has won four medals at the Asia Pacific Bowls Championships including two gold medals, the latest at the 2019 Asia Pacific Bowls Championships in the Gold Coast, Queensland.

Nationals
Van Asch has won an Australian National Bowls Championships title (2021) and four Australian Opens (2014, 2016, 2018, 2019).

References

1988 births
Living people
Australian female bowls players
Bowls World Champions
Commonwealth Games gold medallists for Australia
Commonwealth Games medallists in lawn bowls
Bowls players at the 2018 Commonwealth Games
Bowls players at the 2022 Commonwealth Games
Medallists at the 2018 Commonwealth Games